Savitha Nambrath is a sound designer in the Indian film industry. Her first independent work was with the movie, Stree in 2018. She has worked for films like Dangal, Haider, Talvar, and Barfee. She has also worked on many documentaries and short films that have been showcased in film festivals around the world.

Early life
Savitha Nambrath was born in Pattambi in Palakkad district of Kerala, India to Mohanasundaran and Radha. Later she migrated to Mumbai for doing her PhD in Geography from Mumbai University. She completed her Masters in Applied Geography from University of Madras with Gold medal and first rank prior to her movement to Mumbai.

Selected filmography

 Nitesh Tiwari’s Break Point (web series)
Kunal Deshmukh’s Shiddat
Hardik Mehta’s Roohi (2021 film)
Amar Kaushik’s Bala (2019 film)
Nitesh Tiwari’s Chhichhore
Raj Kumar Gupta's India's Most Wanted
Amar Kaushik's Stree
Nitesh Tiwari's Dangal
Meghna Gulzar's Talvar
Vishal Bhardwaj’s Haider
Anurag Basu's Barfee
Majid Majidi's Beyond the Clouds
Dinesh Vijan's Raabta
Rahul Bose’s Poorna: Courage Has No Limit
Manish Harishankar's Laali Ki Shaadi Mein Laaddoo Deewana
 Ribhu Dasgupta’s Te3n
Raj Kumar Gupta's Ghanchakkar
Prabhu Deva's Rambo Rajkumar
 Shashant Shah’s Bhajathe Raho
Rajesh Pillai's Traffic
Kunal Deshmukh's Raja Natwarlal
Amiya Patnaik's Tulasi Apa

Work as a sound designer for short films: 
 Amar Kaushik's "Aaba"

References

External links
 

Indian sound designers
Living people
Year of birth missing (living people)
University of Madras alumni
University of Mumbai alumni
People from Palakkad district